Greek-speaking Muslims may refer to:

Greek Muslims, Muslims of Greek ethnic origin
Muslim minority (Greece), the multiethnic Muslim minority in Thrace in Greece